Integrated flux nebulas are a relatively recently identified astronomical phenomenon. In contrast to the typical and well known gaseous nebulas within the plane of the Milky Way galaxy, IFNs lie beyond the main body of the galaxy.

The term was coined by Steve Mandel who defined them as "high galactic latitude nebulae that are illuminated not by a single star (as most nebula in the plane of the Galaxy are) but by the energy from the integrated flux of all the stars in the Milky Way. These nebulae clouds, an important component of the interstellar medium, are composed of dust particles, hydrogen and carbon monoxide and other elements." They are particularly prominent in the direction of both the north and south celestial poles. The vast nebula close to the south celestial pole is MW9, commonly known as the South Celestial Serpent.

See also 
 Infrared cirrus

References

Nebulae